Pristen is a genus of moth in the family Cosmopterigidae. It contains only one species, Pristen corusca, which is found in North America, where it has been recorded from Arizona.

References

External links
Natural History Museum Lepidoptera genus database

Chrysopeleiinae
Monotypic moth genera